The 2003 UEFA Women's Cup Final was a two-legged football match that took place on 9 and 21 June 2003 at Gammliavallen and Hjørring Stadium between Umeå IK of Sweden and Fortuna Hjørring of Denmark. It was the first final not to feature German teams. Umeå won the final 7–1 on aggregate.

Match

Details

First leg

Second leg

External links
2002–03 UEFA Women's Cup season at UEFA.com

Women's Cup
Uefa Women's Cup Final 2003
Uefa Women's Cup Final 2003
2003
UEFA
UEFA
UEFA
June 2003 sports events in Europe
Sports competitions in Umeå